Harpalus laticeps is a species of ground beetle in the subfamily Harpalinae. It was described by John Lawrence LeConte in 1850.

References

laticeps
Beetles described in 1850